Westfield is a borough in Tioga County, Pennsylvania,  United States. The population was 1,113 at the time of the 2020 census.

Geography
Westfield is located at  (41.917910, -77.540315).

Demographics

As of the census of 2000, there were 1,190 people, 495 households, and 330 families residing in the borough.

The population density was 1,148.8 people per square mile (441.8/km2). There were 551 housing units at an average density of 531.9 per square mile (204.6/km2).

The racial makeup of the borough was 97.56% White, 1.01% African American, 0.34% Native American, 0.25% Asian, 0.25% from other races, and 0.59% from two or more races. Hispanic or Latino of any race were 0.59% of the population.

There were 495 households, out of which 29.5% had children under the age of eighteen living with them; 49.7% were married couples living together, 12.1% had a female householder with no husband present, and 33.3% were non-families. 28.9% of all households were made up of individuals, and 16.4% had someone living alone who was sixty-five years of age or older.

The average household size was 2.36 and the average family size was 2.85.

In the borough the population was spread out, with 25.3% under the age of eighteen, 7.1% from eighteen to twenty-four, 27.6% from twenty-five to forty-four, 20.3% from forty-five to sixty-four, and 19.8% who were sixty-five years of age or older. The median age was thirty-nine years.

For every one hundred females there were 89.5 males. For every one hundred females who were aged eighteen or older, there were 82.2 males.

The median income for a household in the borough was $27,772, and the median income for a family was $33,688. Males had a median income of $26,607 compared with that of $18,424 for females.

The per capita income for the borough was $13,135.

Roughly 15.9% of families and 22.1% of the population were living below the poverty line, including 29.4% of those who were under the age of eighteen and 13.1% of those who were aged sixty-five or older.

Business
Westfield Pennsylvania is known for the now closed Eberle Tannery, (closed in 2004) was one of the biggest sole leather shoe producers in the world in 1976. The tannery was located on Church Street; demolition of tannery buildings was completed in 2021.

References

Populated places established in 1809
Boroughs in Tioga County, Pennsylvania
1867 establishments in Pennsylvania